Jorge Luis Emerson Ríos Guevara (born 12 December 1999) is a Peruvian footballer who plays as a midfielder for Peruvian Primera División side César Vallejo.

Club career

Cesar Vallejo
Ríos is a product of César Vallejo and got his official and professional debut for the club on 7 May 2017 against Defensor La Bocana in the Peruvian Primera División.

In December 2019, Ríos got his contract extended for one further year. One year later, in December 2020, Ríos signed a new one-year contract extension.

References

External links
 

Living people
1999 births
Association football midfielders
Peruvian footballers
Peruvian Primera División players
Club Deportivo Universidad César Vallejo footballers
People from Trujillo, Peru